Nogometni klub Hrastnik, commonly referred to as NK Hrastnik or simply Hrastnik, is a Slovenian football club from Hrastnik which currently competes only with youth selections. The club was founded in 1924.

References

External links
Official website
Weltfussballarchiv profile

Association football clubs established in 1924
Football clubs in Slovenia
1924 establishments in Slovenia